Trichobranchidae is a family of annelids in the order Terebellida. It consists of one subfamily, Trichobranchinae, to which all of its genera belong.

Genera
 Octobranchus Marion & Bobretzky, 1875
 Terebellides Sars, 1835
 Trichobranchus Malmgren, 1866

References

Polychaetes
Annelid families